Seosamh Ó Duibhginn (1914–1994) was an Irish editor and publisher who wrote mostly in the Irish language. He was a native of County Armagh, Ireland.

Political life
Ó Duibhginn was an Irish Republican and a volunteer in the Irish Republican Army.

References

1914 births
1994 deaths
Irish writers
People from County Armagh